Ayub Khan (born 23 February 1969) is an Indian film and television actor. He is the nephew of actor Dilip Kumar.

Personal life
Khan was born to former 1950s actress Begum Para and actor Nasir Khan.

Khan was married to Niharika Bhasin, in 2000  known for films like Rock On!! (2008) and  The Dirty Picture (2011). They met while in college. When Niharika left for the US for her studies, they married other people. After 11 years they divorced and married each other.

Filmography 
 Dosti zindabad (2017)
 Santa Banta Pvt Ltd (2016) ... Indian High Commissioner
 Yeh Dooriyan (2011) ... Abhay (special appearance)
 Toh Baat Pakki! (2010) ... Surinder Saxena
 Zamaanat (2009) ... Sunil
 Teesri Aankh: The Hidden Camera (2006) ... Inspector Vikram
 Apaharan (2005) ... Kashinath
Revati (film) (2005)
 Tauba Tauba (2004) ... Mohan Shanbagh
 Kuch To Gadbad Hai (2004) ... Sanjay B. Khanna
 Woh (2004) ... Shekhar Amritsari
 LOC: Kargil (2003) ... Major P.S. Janghu
 Gangaajal (2003) ... Inspector Shaheed Khan
 Qayamat: City Under Threat (2003)
 Meghla Akash (2002) ... Jabed Ahmed (Bangladeshi film)
 Kitne Door... Kitne Paas (2002) ... Nimesh
 Dil Chahta Hai (2001) ... Rohit
 Mela (2000) ... Ram Singh, Roopa's brother (special appearance)
 Chehraa (1999) ... Avinash Saxena
 Jaane Jigar (1998) ... Ravi Kumar
 Hafta Vasuli (1998) ... Ram Chauhan
 Khote Sikkey (1998) ... Vijay
 Daadagiri (1997) ... Amar Saxena
 Jeeo Shaan Se (1997) ... Gopala
 Salma Pe Dil Aa Gaya (1997)
 Mrityudand (1997) ... Vinay
 Khilona (1996) ... Ajay
 Smuggler (1996)
 Sanjay (1995) ... Sanjay Singh
 Salaami (1994) ... Vijay
 Meri Aan (1993) ... Salim
 Mashooq (1992) ... Karan Kumar

T.V. series
 Gud Se Meetha Ishq (2022) as Navdeep Shergill
 Spy Bahu (2022) as Arun Nanda
Ranju Ki Betiyaan (2021)... Guddu Mishra
 Ek Bhram Sarvagun Sampanna (2019)... Prem Kumar "PK" Mittal
 Shakti — Astitva Ke Ehsaas Ki (2016–2020)... Maninder Singh
 Saab Ji (2016) as Samar Bahadur - DD National
 Zindagi Abhi Baaki Hai Mere Ghost (2015–2016) ... Keith Adams
 Phir Bhi Na Maane...Badtameez Dil (2015) ... Kuber Malhotraa
 Ek Hasina Thi (2014) ... Rajnath Goenka
 Ek Tha Rusty II and III (2012–2015) ... Inspector Keemat Lal
 Uttaran (2008–2014) ... Jogi Thakur
 Sajda Tere Pyaar Mein (2012)
 Rakhi - Ek Atoot Rishte Ki Dor (2008–09) ... Bhai Raja (Balraaj Thakur)
 Jeete Hain Jiske Liye (2007) ... Anjali's husband
 India Calling (2005-2006) ... Aditya's elder brother or Kamini's husband
 Sahib Biwi Gulam (2004) ... Chhote Babu
 Kasshish
 Alag Alag (2001)
 Piya Bina (2002)
 Tu Naseeb Hai Kisi Aur Ka (2000)
 Sambandh (2000) as Mrityunjay Saxena
 Aandhi (2003) ... Varun
 Karishma - The Miracles of Destiny (2003)
 Trikon (????) ... Inspector Ravi
 Apharan (2001)
 Muskaan (1999) - Rahul 
 ''Mahabharat Katha - Parikshit Abhimanyu's Son

Awards

References

External links

 
 

Living people
Indian male film actors
Indian male television actors
Male actors in Hindi cinema
Indian male soap opera actors
1969 births
Indian people of Hindkowan descent